Al-Hirah ( Middle Persian: Hērt ) was an ancient city in Mesopotamia located south of what is now Kufa in south-central Iraq.

History

Kingdom of the Lakhmids
Al-Hirah was a significant city in pre-Islamic Arab history. Al-Hirah (4th-7th centuries) served as the capital of the Lakhmids, an Arab vassal kingdom of the Sasanian Empire, whom it helped in containing the nomadic Arabs to the south. The Lakhmid rulers of al-Hirah were recognized by Shapur II (309-379), the tenth Sasanian emperor.

A particular Mār 'Abdīšo' was born in Maysan and moved to Ḥīrā after studying elsewhere under Mār 'Abdā. There he gained widespread respect as he built a monastery and lived a pious life. The Sasanian emperor Bahram V won the throne with support of al-Mundhir I ibn al-Nu'man, king of Ḥīrā, in 420. He was amazed and showed great respect as he encountered the saint near the village of Bēṯ 'Arbī on his way back from the imperial capital Seleucia-Ctesiphon.

From c. 527, al-Hirah was opposed by the Ghassanids, a Byzantine-sponsored Arab state in Syria and Palestine. The two powers engaged in a long conflict of their own that functioned as a proxy war for the Byzantine and Sasanian Empires.

In 531, the Sasanians defeated the Byzantine general Belisarius at the Battle of Callinicum south of Edessa (now in southeastern Turkey), with the help of al-Hirah. In 602, Khosrow II deposed al-Nu'man III ibn al-Mundhir and annexed al-Hirah.

Ecclesiastical history

Hirta was the seat of a bishopric of the Church of the East from the 4th century until the 11th century. It belonged to the Patriarchal Province of Seleucia-Ctesiphon.

Today, Hirta is a titular Catholic diocese in Iraq.

Conquered by the Arabs 
Following the Battle of Hira, the city was recaptured by an army of the Hira Arab Bakr tribe under the command of Abu Bakr in May 633.

See also

Abda of Hira
Lakhmids
Kingdom of Hatra

References

Sources

External links

Hirah
Hirah
Hirah
Hirah